"Nothing but You" is a single released by German DJ Paul van Dyk in association with British group Hemstock & Jennings, featuring trance singer Jan Johnston as well as Kym Marsh on vocals. "Nothing but You" is a re-work of Hemstock & Jennings' 2002 single "Arctic". Released in 2003, the song reached number 14 on the UK Singles Chart, number six on the US Billboard Hot Dance Club Play chart and number three on the Dutch Single Top 100.

The vocals featured in the track are Norwegian. The lyric "Jeg har ingenting, men jeg har alt når jeg har deg" translates to "I have nothing, but I have everything when I have you."

Music video
The music video for "Nothing but You" is filmed in the style of the Reflections album. It includes images of the streets of Cape Town and follows a girl who climbs to the top of her apartment to the roof as a boy does the same on the other side of the street, interspersed with shots of Paul van Dyk in his apartment suite doing mundane activities and reflecting with a glum look on his face. At various points in the video, van Dyk looks up at the unnamed girl and thinks to himself, but in the end does nothing, whilst she connects with the boy on the opposite side. The girl and boy both climb down and they meet in the street where they inevitably kiss. The meaning behind this video probably reflects on the vocals of the song; while van Dyk has wealth and fame, he is still unhappy at the thought of being alone, whilst the girl and boy are happy despite not having anything but each other.

Track listings

German 12-inch vinyl
A1. "Nothing but You" (PVD club mix) – 8:25
B1. "Nothing but You" (Vandit club mix) – 7:14
B2. "Nothing but You" (Cirrus mix) – 8:25

UK CD1
 "Nothing but You" (UK radio edit)
 "Nothing but You" (Vandit club mix)
 "La fiesta de la canicas"
 Enhanced video section

UK CD2
 "Nothing but You" (PVD club mix)
 "Nothing but You" (Faithless remix)   
 "Nothing but You" (Cirrus mix)

UK 12-inch vinyl
A1. "Nothing but You" (PVD club mix)
A2. "Nothing but You" (Cirrus mix 2)
AA. "Nothing but You" (Faithless remix)

Australian CD single
 "Nothing but You" (PVD radio mix)
 "Nothing but You" (Vandit radio mix)
 "Nothing but You" (PVD club mix)
 "Nothing but You" (Cirrus mix)
 "Nothing but You" (Vandit club mix)
 "Nothing but You" (Tomekk mix)

Charts

Weekly charts

Year-end charts

Release history

In popular culture
The song was featured in the soundtrack of EA Games FIFA Football 2004 and its Cirrus remix in Need For Speed Underground 2. The song also appears in DJ Hero, mixed together with Sandy Rivera's "I Can't Stop (David Penn Remix)".

References

External links
 

2003 singles
Paul van Dyk songs
Positiva Records singles
Songs written by Paul van Dyk